Sportskeeda is an Indian sports and esports news website, founded in 2009. It is operated by Absolute Sports Private Limited and owned by Indian video game company Nazara Technologies. The website has news, features, commentary, and videos, principally on sports, esports, and pop culture.

History 
Sportskeeda was founded by Porush Jain and his fellow sports enthusiast Srinivas Cuddapah.

The website was initially run from the office of Jain's father in Noida, but moved its operations to Bengaluru in 2011. Sportskeeda was backed by venture capital funding in its initial years. Seedfund, an organisation that funds early-stage ventures, had invested ₹2.8 crore into Sportskeeda in 2011. The Company turned profitable in 2014. Seedfund exited in 2019 when majority stake in the website was acquired by the gaming firm Nazara Technologies in 2019 at a valuation $10M. In May 2022, the company set up its 100% owned subsidiary, Sportskeeda Inc. in Delaware, US.

Coverage and reach 
Sportskeeda has developed a following in USA through its pro wrestling content. Esports and gaming form a significant part of Sportskeeda's content, particularly since the halt in sporting action due to the COVID-19 pandemic. The website registered a 433% user growth with in monthly average users increasing from 15 million to 80 million from 2020 to 2022. Sportskeeda also has partnerships with browsers and mobile OEMs.

See also 
 Cricbuzz
 Bleacher Report
 CBS Sports
 ESPNcricinfo
 Yahoo! Sports
 Fandom (website)
 IGN

References

External links 
 

Indian sport websites
Sport Internet forums
Sports blogs
Indian blogs
Online companies of India
Sports databases
Association football websites
Basketball websites
Boxing websites
Cricket websites
Esports websites
Mixed martial arts websites
Swimming websites
Anime and manga websites